Mar Hall is a 5-star hotel and golf resort in Bishopton, Renfrewshire. It is situated in Erskine House, a category A listed building. Formerly the building was the Erskine Hospital.

History
The Lords Blantyre came into ownership of the Erskine Estate and Erskine House during the early 18th century. In 1828 Major General Robert W. Stuart, the 11th Lord Blantyre commissioned the present house. The latest Erskine House was constructed between 1828 and 1845 at a cost of £50,000. It was designed by Sir Robert Smirke, the architect of the British Museum. Sir Charles Barry designed the fountain & garden lay-out. A nearby quarry (now disused) provided the stone required for construction. The oak interior was imported from Quebec, Canada. The building lay empty as the peerage of the Lords Blantyre ended in 1900. It was then renovated and opened as the Princess Louise Scottish Hospital for Limbless Sailors and Soldiers in 1916. This was to treat soldiers returning from the First World War. A nearby monument commemorates the original owner of Erskine House. It is called Blantyre Monument.

Hotel
A £15m re-fit converted the building into a 5-star hotel which opened in 2004. The official name of the hotel is Earl of Mar; however, locally it is known as Mar Hall. The name recalls the Erskine Estate’s former ownership by the Earl of Mar. The hotel has a swimming pool, gym and 18-hole golf course which hosts Pro-Am tournaments throughout the year.

The hotel was the winner of a TripAdvisor Travellers' Choice Luxury Hotels Award in 2012. Numerous celebrities and well known sports teams have stayed at the hotel, including Kylie Minogue, One Direction, Harry Styles, Neil Diamond, Rangers FC, Scotland National Football Team,  Katy Perry, Robbie Williams, Beyoncé, Coldplay, Oasis, Take That, Bob Dylan, Mike Tyson, Marisa Tomei and Brad Pitt.

Gallery

See also
List of Category A listed buildings in Renfrewshire
List of listed buildings in Erskine, Renfrewshire

References

Category A listed buildings in Renfrewshire
Listed hotels in Scotland
Destination spas
Hotels in Renfrewshire
Defunct hospitals in Scotland
Buildings and structures completed in 1845
Hotels established in 2004
1845 establishments in Scotland
2004 establishments in Scotland
Erskine, Renfrewshire